Rosebud Ben-oni is a Latina-Jewish American poet and writer. She is the author of several collections of poetry, including If This Is the Age We End Discovery (March 2021), which was a Finalist for the 2021 National Jewish Book Award in Poetry and received a Starred Review from Booklist as an "astonishing work for adventurous readers intrigued by science and literature...Ben-Oni draws on the odd properties of supersymmetry to create a dexterous collection of electric lyrics that defies conventions of science and syllabics alike." She has received literarure fellowships and grants from the New York Foundation for the Arts, CantoMundo, Café Royal Cultural Foundation, City Artists Corps and Queens Council on the Arts. In May 2022, Paramount commissioned her video essay “My Judaism is a Wild unPlace" for a campaign for Jewish Heritage Month, which appeared on Paramount Network, MTV Networks, The Smithsonian Channel, VH1 and many others.

Life 
Ben-Oni graduated from New York University.
She was a Rackham Merit Fellow at the University of Michigan.

Her poem "Dancing with Kiko on the Moon" was featured on Tracy K. Smith's The Slowdown. In 2017, the National September 11 Memorial & Museum commissioned her poem "Poet Wrestling with Angels in the Dark." From 2015-2021, she wrote weekly for the blog of The Kenyon Review. She currently lives in New York City, teaches online poetry workshops for the University of California, Los Angeles and Catapult, and has also taught at Poets House. She is a former Editorial Advisor for VIDA: Women in Literary Arts.

Books 
Publishers Weekly states that in If This is the Age We End Discovery, is "Ben-Oni tackles major existential issues—creation, nullification, personal experience, objective truth—with grace, humor, and linguistic flair...while the poet struggles with the big questions, she also makes room for a playful and wishful hope that the creative act can offer humanity a fresh perspective...This ruminative collection blends poetry and science to make the unknown sing.”The Harvard Review writes "these epics could be described as Latinx surrealism. The poems are electric and musical, with varying forms; some occupy an entire page in tight stanzaic forms, while others expand into loose wispy phrases that occupy only parts of the page. Ben-Oni takes readers through marvelous soundscapes derived from the algorithms of imagination..." The Rupture declares that "Ben-Oni is an absolute empress of form...it's hard to believe If This Is the Age We End Discovery was written pre-pandemic, in the sense that what these poems contend with feels not just timely but prescient. Permeability, mortality, divinity, the insidious fallacy of the real/artificial divide, the inevitable rupture of both natural and familial ecosystems; these themes flash before a spotlight Ben-Oni refuses to shine in any single direction, sending the brxght xyx of her intellect caroming from mystery to mystery, twinned by the sharp report of her incisive phrasing." The Millions praised the collection as "Ben-Oni courts wonder throughout this book, while acknowledging that opening ourselves to the search can be perilous."

Her second collection, turn around, BRXGHT XYXS, was published by Get Fresh LLC in Fall 2019, and won the Bisexual Poetry Award at the 8th Annual Bisexual Book Awards from the Bi Writers Association. "Matarose lives in Queens, New York, and she's a queen herself," wrote Dorothy Chan in her review of turn around, BRXGHT XYXS in Poetry Magazine, "Ben-Oni’s speaker constantly gives us meta: she basks in the cultural references of her childhood, yet she transcends them. If popular culture serves as commentary that combines the politics and social critiques of a time period, then the poet takes this up ten notches, presenting popular culture from both her coming-of-age youth and the present moment in time....I read turn around, BRXGHT XYXS as a poetic striptease." The Chicago Review of Books called turn around, BRXGHT XYXS "a book-length love poem to the self that would make Whitman both proud and blush. Ben-Oni’s poems are ecstatically and unabashedly feminist, queer, punk, Latinx, and Jewish, making hers a unique and vital voice for our times.” Jewish Currents states that "the propulsion and scope of Ben-Oni's poems— engaging everything from biblical figures to '80s music— give each word an exhilarating amount of power... turn around, BRXGHT XYXS audaciously owns its otherness, traveling the world—and the universe—without losing sight of the United States we now inhabit."

Her chapbook 20 Atomic Sonnets was published online from Black Warrior Review; Ben-Oni states she wanted "to make 20 Atomic Sonnets free [and] available online, as to reach as many people as possible in the time of this (Covid-19) pandemic....this chapbook is part of a larger project that will be a full-length collection in the future." In her review for Rhino, Dona Vorreyer writes: "“Who knew that one could feel sorry for an electron, be smitten with the bad-boy toxicity of Fluorine, commiserate with the unstable loneliness of Cesium, or swoon over the sensuality of Gallium?…This chapbook renews a wonder in science… With its tour-de-force attention to detail, its enticing sounds and rhythms and its clever and astute references, 20 Atomic Sonnets leaves the reader wanting more. And hopefully with many more elements in the periodic table, this set of sonnets will only be the beginning.” Leslie Archibald states in Interstellar Flight Press: "“I wanted to review this collection of sonnets because I wanted to fall in love. I wanted to fall in love with the sonnet again and I did… In 20 Atomic Sonnets, the unique structure coupled with the author’s use of slant and embedded rhyme creates the sonnet aesthetic without overpowering the text…Ben-Oni pays homage to nineties metal poets by relating certain elements to groups like Nirvana, STP, and Bon Jovi.”

Selected work

Books 
If This is the Age We End Discovery. Alice James Books, 2021. 
turn around, BRXGHT XYXS. Get Fresh LLC, 2019. 
Solecism: poems. Virtual Artists Collective, 2013. ,

Chapbooks 

 20 Atomic Sonnets. Black Warrior Review. 2020.

Selected Poems 
“\D E A T {H :: O R S E} \\\.” The Massachusetts Review. Winter 2022. Volume 63, No. 4.    
“Qaemot for What Would Make Us Planets and other poems" Waxwing. Winter 2022. Issue XXVI.  
“Night{Call} :: Post-Assault Bathing” Poetry Wales. Winter 2021. Vol. 57, No. 2: 55. 
“So They Say— They Finally Nailed— the Proton’s Size— & Hope— Dies—” Poem-A-Day: Academy of American Poets. September 24, 2020. 
"Poet Wrestling with Blood Falling Silent" Poetry. July/August 2020 Issue.
“While New Zealand Declares the Tooth Fairy & Easter Bunny Essential Workers.” The Kenyon Review. 18 June 2020.
"Poet Wrestling with Surface Tension" Poetry. December 2019 Issue.
"Poet Wrestling with Her Empire of Dirt" Poetry. February 2019 Issue.
"Poet Wrestling with Atonement." Academy of American Poets. 208.
"Poet Wrestling with Starhorse in the Dark" Tin House. Summer 2018 Issue.
"Poet Wrestling with the Possibility She's Living in a Simulation." Guernica, 25 June 2018.
"A Horse Dies Once That Is a Lie" POETRY Magazine, January 2018.
"I Guess We'll Have to Be Secretly in Love with Each other & Leave it at That" Frontier Poetry, 17 Nov 2017.
"Axolotls Do It Better, So Now I Am an Axolot" The Adroit Journal. Issue 23, 2017.
"Matarose Tags G-Dragon on the 7." POETRY Magazine, October 2016.
"On Childbearing." Prairie Schooner, Volume 90, Number 3, Fall 2016.
"Forgetting is the Ghost that Keeps You Alive." Prelude, Issue 3. 2016.
"All That Is and Is Not Nuclear Is Our Family." The Journal, Issue 40.4, Fall 2016
"From The Last Great Adventure Is You." Waxwing, Issue IX, Summer 2016.

References 

Living people
Jewish American poets
Year of birth missing (living people)
University of Michigan fellows
21st-century American Jews